Ben Zonneveld (Bernardus Joannes Maria Zonneveld; born 1940) is a Dutch plant scientist and botanist known for his work on the genetics of Tulips and Daffodils, and their infrageneric classification.

Career 
Dr Zonneld received his Ph.D. in mathematical sciences (Biology & Genetics) from Leiden in 1972, where he became a Professor of Genetics at the Institute of Biology. He carried out botanical expeditions in southern (1970s-90s), South Africa (2000), and Mexico (2005).

After working at the Institute of Molecular Plant Sciences, Clusius laboratory, University of Leiden, before moving to the herbarium at Naturalis, in the same city.

He has published widely in the field of plant genetics.

Publications 

Select publications include:

References 

1940 births
Living people
20th-century Dutch botanists
21st-century Dutch botanists
Leiden University alumni
People from Leiden